Linda Ørmen (born 22 March 1977) is a former Norwegian football player who played for the Norway national team from 1998 to 2001.

She played on the Norwegian team that finished fourth at the 1999 FIFA World Cup in the United States.

Ørmen played for the clubs Athene Moss, Kolbotn IL, New York Power, and Asker.

References

External links

WUSA player profile

1977 births
Living people
Norwegian women's footballers
Norway women's international footballers
Women's association football forwards
2003 FIFA Women's World Cup players
1999 FIFA Women's World Cup players
New York Power players
Kolbotn Fotball players
Asker Fotball (women) players
Women's United Soccer Association players